Skenea larseni is a species of small sea snail, a marine gastropod mollusk in the family Skeneidae.

Description
The size of the shell attains 2 mm.

Distribution
This species occurs in northern Atlantic Ocean off southern Iceland to southern Faroes

References

 Warén A., 1993: New and little known mollusca from Iceland and Scandinavia. Part 2; Sarsia 78: 159–201
 Gofas, S.; Le Renard, J.; Bouchet, P. (2001). Mollusca, in: Costello, M.J. et al. (Ed.) (2001). European register of marine species: a check-list of the marine species in Europe and a bibliography of guides to their identification. Collection Patrimoines Naturels, 50: pp. 180–213

External links
 

larseni
Gastropods described in 1993